The David Hilbert Award, named after David Hilbert,  was established by the World Federation of National Mathematics Competitions to acknowledge mathematicians who have contributed to the development of mathematics worldwide.

Each awardee is selected by the Executive and Advisory Committee of the World Federation of National Mathematics Competitions on the recommendation of the WFNMC Awards Subcommittee.

Past recipients

 1991 
Edward Barbeau, Canada
Arthur Engel, Germany
Graham Pollard, Australia
 1992
 Martin Gardner, United States of America
 Murray Klamkin, United States of America
 Marcin E Kuczma, Poland
 1994
 María Falk de Losada, United States of America
 Peter J. O'Halloran, Australia
 1996
 Andy Liu, Canada

See also

 List of mathematics awards

Notes

References

Sources
 Homepage of the award.

Mathematics awards